Cape Martin Lighthouse is a lighthouse located on Cape Martin near Beachport at the north end of Rivoli Bay in South Australia. It was first lit in 1960. It replaced the Penguin Island Lighthouse whose light apparatus was reused in the new tower. The lighthouse was converted to mains power electricity in 1974. However, the gradual build up of sand dunes obscured the light.

See also

 List of lighthouses in Australia

References

External links

 Australian Maritime Safety Authority

Lighthouses completed in 1960
Lighthouses in South Australia
1960 establishments in Australia